Russell Shaw may refer to:
 Russell Shaw (American football) (born 1976), wide receiver and defensive back
 Russell Shaw (composer), British composer and sound designer
 Russell Shaw Higgs (born 1960), artist and political activist